SOAD is a common initialism for Armenian-American heavy metal band System of a Down. Soad may also refer to:

Education
The Penny W. Stamps School of Art & Design at the University of Michigan
The School of Architecture and Design at the University of Louisiana at Lafayette
The School of Art and Design, part of the College of Fine Arts and Communication at East Carolina University
The Student Organizations and Activities Division at Silliman University

People
 Souad , list of people with name, including Soad

Other uses
The Hajja Soad mosque, a mosque in Khartoum 
Service-oriented analysis and design, a concept in service-oriented modeling

See also
Soap (disambiguation)